This article covers the 2011 football season in Chile.

National tournaments

Primera División

Apertura Champion: Universidad de Chile (14th title)
Topscorer: Matías Urbano (12 goals)
Clausura  Champion: Universidad de Chile (15th title)
Topscorer: Esteban Paredes (14 goals)
Relegated: Santiago Morning and Ñublense

Copa Chile

Winner: Universidad Católica (5th title)

International Tournaments

Copa Libertadores

Club Deportivo Universidad Católica: Quarterfinals.
Colo-Colo: Group Stage.
Unión Española: Group Stage.

Copa Sudamericana

Club Universidad de Chile: Champion (1st Title)
Club Deportivo Universidad Católica: Round of 16.
Deportes Iquique: Second Stage.

National team results

The Chile national football team results and fixtures for 2011.

2011 Copa América

2014 World Cup qualifiers

Friendly matches

Record

Goal scorers

As of 15 November 2011

References

 Chile: Fixtures and Results

External links
The official Chilean Football Association web site

 
Seasons in Chilean football